Blyth Power are a British rock band formed in 1983 by singer and drummer Joseph Porter, formerly of anarcho-punk bands Zounds and The Mob.  The band's music shows strong influences from punk rock and folk music and Porter's lyrics often centre on themes from mythology and history.

The band have released more than a dozen studio albums, since 1993 on their own label Downwarde Spiral Records.

Career
Established in 1983 and named after a railway locomotive, the one constant in an ever-shifting lineup has been drummer, vocalist, and songwriter Joseph Porter (real name Gary Hatcher, born 21 February 1962 in Templecombe, Somerset, England), who formed the band with Curtis Youé, another former member of anarcho-punk band The Mob.  The band have subsequently been through many line-up changes; their 1990 album Alnwick and Tyne featured Jamie Hince, later of The Kills, on lead guitar.

The band's first release was a cassette, A Little Touch of Harry in the Night, in 1984.

Since 1993, Blyth Power recordings have been released on their own label, Downwarde Spiral. Since 2000 they have cut back on their touring schedule due to various personal commitments, but they have organised an annual mini-festival, the Blyth Power Ashes. The festival takes place in August of each year, and combines live music with a cricket match featuring band members and their associates. From 2011 the event moved to The Plough, in Farcet Fen near Peterborough due to its ever-increasing popularity. From 2015 to 2019, The Ashes took place at The Hunters Inn in Longdon, near Tewkesbury.

Joseph Porter has also been involved with various side-projects, such as doing solo guitarist/vocalist performances and collaborating in two other bands, Red Wedding and Mad Dogs & Englishmen.

Musical style
The band's lyrics often deal with episodes from history, ranging from the Trojan War to the Cod Wars, as well as aspects of English culture such as cricket, village life and trains, as well as a lot of politics.  Porter is an avowed trainspotter, and in August 1998 the band appeared on the LWT religious affairs television programme Holy Smoke! in a slot in which musicians discussed their individual religions — with trainspotting cited as his religion.

Members

Current members

Former members

Timeline

Discography

Albums

Studio albums

Live albums

Compilation albums

Singles

Appearances
"Reality Asylum" - cover version of the song by Crass on the compilation album You've Heard It All Before (1993)

Related albums
When Death Went to Bed With a Lady (1998, Joseph Porter solo album)
Going Down with Alice (2000, album by Mad Dogs and Englishmen, including Joseph Porter)
Red Wedding (2004, acoustic album by Steven Cooper and Joseph Porter)

Videos
Do the One About the Horse (1990)
Live in Harlow (1995)

References

External links
Blyth Power official site

English punk rock groups
Anarcho-punk groups
Folk punk groups
British indie rock groups